Mac McNeilly is an American musician, best known as the drummer for The Jesus Lizard. He also played drums in bands P.W. Long's Reelfoot, 86, Mouse, Come, and played bass in Phantom 309. He is known for his very powerful, solid and hard-hitting style. McNeilly first appeared with The Jesus Lizard on the album Head, the band having previously used a drum machine. He was replaced by Jim Kimball late in 1996. He rejoined the Jesus Lizard for their 2009 reunion.

External links
 The Jesus Lizard homepage page on McNeilly

Living people
1960 births
Post-hardcore musicians
Noise rock musicians
The Jesus Lizard members
20th-century American drummers
American male drummers
20th-century American male musicians